The Fribourg funicular, also known as the Neuveville - Saint-Pierre funicular, is a funicular railway in the Swiss town of Fribourg. 

It is powered by wastewater.

History 
The Fribourg funicular was opened February 4, 1899. It connects the Saint-Pierre and Neuveville neighborhoods of Fribourg. It closed briefly for maintenance in 1996 and 2014.

Operation 
The rolling stock is made up of two opposing Von Roll cabins, which act as counterweights. Wastewater from the Saint-Pierre neighborhood is poured into the upper cabin, driving it downwards and the other cabin upwards. The wastewater is then dumped back out into the lower Neuveville neighborhood's sewer system. Racks are present at the bottom station for braking.

See also 
 List of funiculars in Switzerland

References 
	

Funicular railways in Switzerland
Water-powered funicular railways
Transport in the canton of Fribourg
1200 mm gauge railways in Switzerland
Railway lines opened in 1899